Puka Rumi (Quechua puka red, rumi stone, "red stone", Hispanicized spelling Pucarumi) is a  mountain in the northern part of the Chunta mountain range in the Andes of Peru. It is situated in the Huancavelica Region, Huancavelica Province, Acobambilla District, and in the Junín Region, Huancayo Province, Chongos Alto District. Puka Rumi lies southeast of Ñawinqucha.

References

Mountains of Huancavelica Region
Mountains of Junín Region
Mountains of Peru